Richard Florizone (born 1967) is a Canadian academic and physicist who served as the 11th president of Dalhousie University in Halifax, Nova Scotia.

Biography 
R. Florizone was born in Prince Albert, Saskatchewan in 1967. He attended the University of Saskatchewan, where, in 1990, he earned a Bachelor's degree in engineering physics and, in 1992, a Master's degree in physics. He then attended Massachusetts Institute of Technology where, in 1998, he earned a PhD in physics. In 2013, he was appointed President of Dalhousie University. Prior to Dalhousie, Florizone had worked at Bombardier Aerospace, Boston Consulting Group, University of Cambridge, the International Finance Corporation, and University of Saskatchewan. Early in his presidency, Dalhousie faced an incident involving male dental students sending explicit messages, some of which included fellow female students. Under Florizone’s leadership, Dalhousie undertook a series of initiatives to address the incident and its broader implications: A Restorative Justice process for those directly involved, review by the Academic Standards Class Committee, a Task Force on Misogyny, Sexism and Homophobia in the Faculty of Dentistry and urgent attention to the University’s strategic initiative on Diversity and Inclusiveness. In 2018, Florizone announced that he was stepping down as President of Dalhousie University to serve as the Director of the Quantum Valley Ideas Lab at the University of Waterloo. During his tenure, Dalhousie successfully grew enrolment, fundraising and research income. In January, 2020, he began as the President and CEO of the International Institute for Sustainable Development.

References 

1968 births
People from Prince Albert, Saskatchewan
Academic staff of the Dalhousie University
Living people